Botoșani County is a county (județ) of Romania, in Western Moldavia (encompassing a few villages in neighbouring Suceava County from Bukovina to the west as well), with the capital town at Botoșani.

Demographics 

As of 31 October 2011, it had a population of 412,626 and the population density was 83/km2.

 Romanians – 94.1%
 Romani – 1%
 Ukrainians – 0.2%
 Lipovans – 0.1%
 Other ethnicities – 0.1%
 Unknown ethnicity – 4.6%

Geography
 Botoșani County is situated between the rivers Siret and Prut, in the northeastern part of Romania, bordering Ukraine to the north and Moldova to the east. To the west and south it has borders with Suceava and Iași counties.
 The relief is a high plain, between the valleys of the Siret and the Prut, and the latter's affluent, the Jijia River.
 It has a temperate climate, influenced by the eastern air masses of the continent.

Neighbours

Republic of Moldova in the East – Edineț Raion.
Suceava County in the West.
Ukraine in the North – Chernivtsi Oblast.
Iași County in the South.

Economy

This is a predominantly agricultural county; the main industries are the textile industry, the food industry, the electrical components industry, and the glass and porcelain industry.

The  is one of the largest hydroelectric power plants in Romania.  Work on it started in 1973, and it was completed in 1978, at the same time as the Stânca-Costești Dam. They are both situated on the Prut River, between Stânca in Botoșani County and Costești, Moldova.

Politics 

The Botoșani County Council, renewed at the 2020 local elections, consists of 32 counsellors, with the following party composition:

Administrative divisions

Botoșani County has 2 municipalities, 5 towns and 71 communes:

Municipalities 
Botoșani – capital city; population: 106,847 (as of 2011)
Dorohoi

Towns 

Bucecea
Darabani
Flămânzi
Săveni
Ștefănești

Communes 

Adășeni
Albești
Avrămeni
Bălușeni
Blândești
Brăești
Broscăuți
Călărași
Cândești
Concești
Copălău
Cordăreni
Corlăteni
Corni
Coșula
Coțușca
Cristești
Cristinești
Curtești
Dersca
Dângeni
Dimăcheni
Dobârceni
Drăgușeni
Durnești
Frumușica
George Enescu
Gorbănești
Havârna
Hănești
Hilișeu-Horia
Hlipiceni
Hudești
Ibănești
Leorda
Lozna
Lunca
Manoleasa
Mihai Eminescu
Mihăileni
Mihălășeni
Mileanca
Mitoc
Nicșeni
Păltiniș
Pomârla
Prăjeni
Rădăuți-Prut
Răchiți
Răuseni
Ripiceni
Roma
Românești
Santa Mare
Stăuceni
Suharău
Sulița
Șendriceni
Știubieni
Todireni
Trușești
Tudora
Ungureni
Unțeni
Văculești
Viișoara
Vârfu Câmpului
Vlădeni
Vlăsinești
Vorniceni
Vorona

Historical county

During the years between the world wars, the county extended over different territory than currently. It was located in the northeastern part of Romania, in the northeast of the region or Moldavia. The county included the southern part of the present county and the northern part of the current Iași County. It was bordered to the west by the counties of Suceava and Baia, to the north by Dorohoi, to the east by Bălți, and to the south with Iași.

Administration

In 1930, the county was divided into three districts (plăși):
Plasa Botoșani
Plasa Jijia
Plasa Siret

Administration was re-organized in 1938, comprising 4 districts:
Plasa Bucecea (with 52 villages, headquartered in Târgu Bucecea)
Plasa Răchiți (with 73 villages, headquartered in Botoșani)
Plasa Sulița (with 49 villages, headquartered in Hârlău)
Plasa Ștefănești (with 77 villages, headquartered in Ștefănești)

Population 
According to the 1930 census data, the county population was 218,258 inhabitants, ethnically, 88.8% were Romanians, 9.0% were Jews, as well as other minorities. From the religious point of view, 89.4% were Eastern Orthodox, 9.2% Jewish, 0.7% Roman Catholic, as well as other minorities.

Urban population 
In 1930, the county's urban population was 50,320 inhabitants, comprising ethnically 64.9% Romanians, 31.3% Jews, 0.9% Germans, as well as other minorities. From the religious point of view, the urban population was composed of Eastern Orthodox (64.5%), Jewish (32.3%), Roman Catholic (2.1%), as well as other minorities.

Notable people
Natives of the county include:
 Grigore Antipa (1866–1944), naturalist
 Teoctist Arăpașu (1915–2007), patriarch
 Gheorghe Avramescu (1884–1945), general
 Emil Bobu (1927–2014), politician
 Demostene Botez (1893–1973), poet
 Dimitrie Brândză (1846–1895), botanist
 Mihai Eminescu (1850–1889), poet
 George Enescu (1881–1955), composer
 Nicolae Iorga (1871–1940), historian and politician 
 Ștefan Luchian (1868–1916), painter
 Gheorghe Moroșanu (b. 1950), mathematician
 Dimitrie Pompeiu (1873–1954), mathematician
 Alexandru Zub (b. 1934), historian

See also
 2010 Romanian floods
 Miletin River

Notes

References

External links

 
Counties of Romania
1879 establishments in Romania
1938 disestablishments in Romania
States and territories disestablished in 1938
States and territories established in 1879
1940 establishments in Romania
1950 disestablishments in Romania
States and territories established in 1940
States and territories disestablished in 1950